The 2006–07 Greek Football Cup was the 65th edition of the Greek Football Cup, competition. That season's edition was the first to be entitled "Hellas On Line Greek Cup". The competition started on 26 August 2006 and concluded on 5 May 2007 with the Final, held at the Panthessaliko Stadium. AEL won the trophy with a 2–1 victory over Panathinaikos.

Calendar

Knockout phase
Each tie in the knockout phase, apart from the quarter-finals and the semi-finals, was played by a single match. If the score was level at the end of normal time, extra time was played, followed by a penalty shoot-out if the score was still level. In the quarter-finals and the semi-finals were played over two legs, with each team playing one leg at home. The team that scored more goals on aggregate over the two legs advanced to the next round. If the aggregate score was level, the away goals rule was applied, i.e. the team that scored more goals away from home over the two legs advanced. If away goals were also equal, then extra time was played. The away goals rule was again applied after extra time, i.e. if there were goals scored during extra time and the aggregate score was still level, the visiting team advanced by virtue of more away goals scored. If no goals were scored during extra time, the winners were decided by a penalty shoot-out. In the round of 16, if the score was level at the end of normal time the two-legged rule was applied.The mechanism of the draws for each round is as follows:
In the draw for the second round, the teams from the second division are seeded and the winners from the first round were unseeded. The seeded teams are drawn against the unseeded teams.
In the draw for the Round of 32 onwards, the teams from the first division are seeded and the winners from the previous rounds were unseeded. The seeded teams are drawn against the unseeded teams.
In the draws for the Round of 16 onwards, there are no seedings and teams from the different group can be drawn against each other.

First round
The draw took place on 17 August 2006.

Summary

|-
|colspan="3" style="background-color:#D0D0D0" align=center|26 August 2006

|-
|colspan="3" style="background-color:#D0D0D0" align=center|27 August 2006

|-
|colspan="3" style="background-color:#D0D0D0" align=center|30 August 2006

|-
|colspan="3" style="background-color:#D0D0D0" align=center|N/A

|}

Matches

Second round
The draw took place on 17 August 2006, after the First Round draw.

Summary

|-
|colspan="3" style="background-color:#D0D0D0" align=center|20 September 2006

|-
|colspan="3" style="background-color:#D0D0D0" align=center|N/A

|}

Matches

Additional round

Summary

|}

Matches

Bracket

Round of 32
The draw took place on 17 August 2006.

Summary

|}

Matches

Round of 16
The draw took place on 16 November 2006.

Summary

||colspan="2" rowspan="3" 

}
||colspan="2" 

|}

Matches

Replay

Quarter-finals
The draw took place on 11 January 2007.

Summary

|}

Matches

Panathinaikos won 4–3 on aggregate.

PAS Giannina won 3–2 on aggregate.

Skoda Xanthi won 3–0 on aggregate.

AEL won 2–0 on aggregate.

Semi-finals
The draw took place on 11 January 2007, after the quarter-final draw.

Summary

|}

Matches

Panathinaikos won 1–0 on aggregate.

Larissa won 4–0 on aggregate.

Final

References

External links
Greek Cup 2006-2007 at RSSSF
Greek Cup 2006-2007 at Hellenic Football Federation's official site

Greek Football Cup seasons
Greek Cup
Cup